Bishop Petro Loza  (born 3 June 1979 in Kolodentsi, Kamianka-Buzka Raion, Lviv Oblast, Ukrainian SSR) is a Ukrainian Greek Catholic hierarch as the Titular Bishop of Panium and Auxiliary bishop of Sokal–Zhovkva since 12 April 2018.

Life
Bishop Loza, after graduation of the school education, joined the Congregation of the Most Holy Redeemer in 1997; he had a profession in 1998 and a solemn profession in 2003, and was ordained as priest on August 26, 2007, after graduation of the Major Redemptorists Theological Seminary in Lviv, Ukraine (1998–2001) and the University of Innsbruck, Austria (2001–2009). During 2011–2014 he served as a provincial assistant for the Ukrainian Redemptorists Province and from 2014 until 2018 was a superior in the Sts. Peter and Paul church in Chernihiv.

On April 12, 2018, he was confirmed by the Pope Francis as the first Auxiliary Bishop of Ukrainian Catholic Eparchy of Sokal–Zhovkva, Ukraine and Titular Bishop of Panium. On July 12, 2018, he was consecrated as bishop by Major Archbishop Sviatoslav Shevchuk and other hierarchs of the Ukrainian Greek Catholic Church in the Sts Peter and Paul Cathedral in Sokal.

References

External links

1979 births
Living people
People from Lviv Oblast
Redemptorists
Redemptorist bishops
Ukrainian Eastern Catholics
Bishops of the Ukrainian Greek Catholic Church
University of Innsbruck alumni